Consuelo María Callahan (born June 9, 1950) is a United States circuit judge of the United States Court of Appeals for the Ninth Circuit.

Background

Consuelo María Callahan was born June 9, 1950 in Palo Alto, California. She was raised in Fremont, California and attended public schools in Fremont and in Los Altos, California. In 1972, she graduated from Stanford University with Bachelor of Arts degree, cum laude, in English. She graduated from McGeorge School of Law at the University of the Pacific, with a Juris Doctor in 1975. In 2004, she received a Master of Laws from the University of Virginia School of Law.

Consuelo Callahan began her law career as the Deputy City Attorney for Stockton, California, and then became Deputy District Attorney in San Joaquin County, California. She focused her practice on child abuse and sexual assault cases. In 1986, she became a commissioner of the Stockton Municipal Court. In 1992, she became the first Hispanic woman to be appointed to the San Joaquin County Superior Court. In 1996, Governor Pete Wilson appointed her to serve on the Third District California Court of Appeal in Sacramento.

Ninth Circuit nomination and confirmation

On February 12, 2003, Callahan was nominated by President George W. Bush to serve on the United States Court of Appeals for the Ninth Circuit. Her Senate confirmation hearing was on May 7, 2003. On May 22, 2003, she was confirmed by a 99–0 vote. She received her judicial commission on May 28, 2003.

Possible Supreme Court nomination

On September 20, 2005, The New York Times named Callahan as a George W. Bush Supreme Court candidate for United States Supreme Court justice, to replace Sandra Day O'Connor. She was supported by some Democrats and the Congressional Hispanic Caucus as being more moderate than many of Bush's other appointees. On October 9, 2005 Chicago Sun-Times columnist Robert Novak reported Callahan was one of two finalists for the O'Connor seat, the other being White House Counsel Harriet Miers, whom Bush nominated. On October 27, 2005, Miers withdrew her name from consideration and again, Callahan was mentioned as a possible nominee. Bush ultimately nominated Samuel Alito to O'Connor's seat.

Awards and honors

On July 14, 2014, Judge Callahan was presented the  Ninth Circuit Professionalism Award from the American Inns of Court. The award presentation occurred at the Ninth Circuit Judicial Conference in Monterey, California and was presented by Dean Deanell Reece Tacha of the Pepperdine University School of Law; Dean Tacha was a retired judge of the United States Court of Appeals for the Tenth Circuit and current president of the American Inns of Court Foundation.

See also
List of first women lawyers and judges in California
List of Hispanic/Latino American jurists

References

External links

Biography from Ninth Circuit Court

1950 births
21st-century American judges
Living people
Hispanic and Latino American judges
Judges of the United States Court of Appeals for the Ninth Circuit
McGeorge School of Law alumni
People from Fremont, California
Stanford University alumni
United States court of appeals judges appointed by George W. Bush
People from Palo Alto, California
People from Los Altos, California
People from San Joaquin County, California
21st-century American women judges